Biber is a river in Thuringia, Germany, that flows into the Schleuse in Lichtenau.

See also
List of rivers of Thuringia

Rivers of Thuringia
Rivers of Germany